The Nissan Bevel is a concept crossover SUV unveiled at the 2007 North American International Auto Show.  It is of asymmetrical design, with one large driver's door, and two smaller doors on the passenger side.

Carlos Tavares, Nissan Motor Co. executive president of global product planning and design, says the Bevel is a study for 45- to 60-year-old men who like to keep many tools in their vehicle, transport things, do projects outside the house and only rarely carry passengers. The owner would be driving alone 90 percent of the time, Tavares imagines. 

Nissan has no specific plan to produce the Bevel, but inform future models.

One of the concept vehicles was at Express Scrap Metals, a wrecking yard just outside Tennessee, USA alongside the 2002 Nissan Quest concept in early March 2022. Both the Bevel, and Quest concept were destroyed, along with the 1999 NCS concept.

References

Bevel
Crossover sport utility vehicles
All-wheel-drive vehicles
Front-wheel-drive vehicles